Boissiere is an anglicised form of the French name Boissière, which is related to the French word bois, meaning wood.  It is part of a number of place names and is a common family name.

Places
 Boissières, Gard, in the Gard département of France
 Boissières, Lot, in the Lot département of France
Boissière (Paris Métro) is the name of a Metro station in Paris
La Grande Boissière is the name of one of the campuses of the International School of Geneva
Boissiere Village is a village in Trinidad and Tobago

People
Jean-Baptiste Boissière, a 19th-century French lexicographer
Jean Galtier-Boissière, a French writer and journalist who wrote for the Canard enchaîné
Ralph de Boissière, a Trinidadian and Tobagonian novelist

See also
La Boissière (disambiguation)

pl:Boissière